A porrón is a traditional glass wine pitcher, which holds  typical of Spain, originating in Catalonia, in northeastern Spain, and eventually spreading to other parts of Spain. This invention allows everyone to drink from the same utensil without touching it with their lips. It fosters communal drinking accompanying food, though it does require some skill to ensure the wine enters one's mouth and to keep it from spilling onto clothing. Some might say it resembles a cross between a wine bottle and a watering can. The top of the bottle is narrow and can be sealed off with a cork. Stemming upwards from the bottom of the pitcher is a spout that gradually tapers off to a small opening. It is shaped such that the wine stored inside it will have minimal contact with the air, while being ready to be used at all times. Until the mid-twentieth century it was very common in homes, but the tradition is now slowly being lost. The idea originated as a replacement to bota bags. Porrons are most commonly filled with regular wines, either white or red, but are also used to drink cava, and a smaller version filled with a sweet, dessert wine (typically Grenache) is also common in Catalan restaurants. The lack of contact with the lips allows a group of people to share the same vessel without offending their sense of hygiene.

Drinking from a porrón 
To drink from a porrón, a beginner starts by bringing the spout very close to his or her mouth and tilts it forward slowly so the beak points towards the teeth. Once the liquid starts coming out, the porró is pulled away from the face while the drinker looks up. To finish drinking, a beginner lowers the porró and brings it back down and closer to the mouth again before stopping, quickly tilting the spout up at the last moment so there is no spillage. A regular user can start and stop drinking from the porró with the spout held at a distance without spilling a drop.

Although drinking from porrons has been largely replaced with bottles and glasses, they are still a feature of Catalan/Spanish-themed restaurants, mainly as a novelty for diners to test their skills.

The porrón in literature
George Orwell described a porró in Homage to Catalonia:

See also

The botijo, called a càntir in Catalan, is a clay jar used for cooling water. The drinking style is similar to that of the porró.
Briq, a Lebanese water vessel of similar design.
Wine accessory
Wine tasting

References

External links
 

Drinkware
Catalan cuisine
Spanish cuisine
Wine accessories